Dichomeris resignata is a moth in the family Gelechiidae. It was described by Edward Meyrick in 1929. It is found on the Bismarck Archipelago and the New Hebrides in the South Pacific Ocean .

The forewings are whitish ochreous, with some slight fuscous speckling on the dorsal area and very few minute black specks on the costa, as well as two small dark fuscous marks or dots beyond the middle. The stigmata is small, dark fuscous or blackish, with the plical rather obliquely before the first discal, and sometimes with an additional dot midway between the first discal and the base, as well as a marginal series of blackish dots around the apex and termen. The hindwings are grey.

References

Moths described in 1929
resignata